Pretty Lady is an album by pianist Les McCann recorded in 1961 and released on the Pacific Jazz label.

Reception

Allmusic gives the album 4 stars.

Track listing 
All compositions by Les McCann except as indicated
 "Django" (John Lewis) - 5:10
 "Dorene Don't Cry, I" - 5:16
 "Pretty Lady" - 4:42
 "Stella By Starlight" (Victor Young, Ned Washington) - 5:38
 "On Green Dolphin Street" (Bronisław Kaper, Washington) - 6:38
 "I'll Take Romance" (Ben Oakland, Oscar Hammerstein II) 	6:12
 "Little Girl Blue" (Richard Rodgers, Lorenz Hart) - 7:15

Personnel 
Les McCann - piano
Herbie Lewis - bass
Ron Jefferson - drums

References 

Les McCann albums
1961 albums
Pacific Jazz Records albums